Mrs. American Pie is an upcoming period comedy miniseries developed by Abe Sylvia based on the novel Mr. & Mrs. American Pie by Juliet McDaniel.

Premise
A woman works towards attaining a place in Palm Beach high society, in the process learning what she will and won't do to achieve this.

Cast

Main
 Kristen Wiig as Maxime Simmons
 Laura Dern as Linda
 Allison Janney as Evelyn
 Leslie Bibb as Dinah
 Ricky Martin as Robert
 Josh Lucas as Douglas
 Carol Burnett as Norma
 Amber Chardae Robinson as Virginia

Recurring
 Jordan Bridges as Perry Donohue
 Kaia Gerber as Mitzi
 Jason Canela as Eddie
 Mindy Cohn as Ann
 Julia Duffy as Mary Jones Davidsoul
 Claudia Ferri as Raquel
 Rick Cosnett as Sergeant Tom Sanka
 Benton Jennings as Theodore Thimble III

Episodes
The ten episodes of the first season are written by Abe Sylvia, Sheri Holman, Sharr White, Becky Mode, Emma Rathbone, Emma Rathbone, Celeste Hughey, Sharr White, Kelly Hutchinson, and Sheri Holman & Kelly Hutchinson, respectively.

Production
It was announced in February 2022 that Apple TV+ had given a greenlight to the 10-part series, which would see Kristen Wiig star, and Laura Dern executive producing in addition to potentially co-starring. Abe Sylvia will write the series with Tate Taylor directing. In May, Allison Janney, Leslie Bibb, Ricky Martin and Josh Lucas were added to the cast. Carol Burnett, Amber Chardae Robinson, Jordan Bridges, Kaia Gerber and Julia Duffy would be amongst additional castings announced in June.

Filming began in May 2022.

References

External links

Apple TV+ original programming
Upcoming comedy television series
American comedy television series
Television shows based on American novels
Television shows set in Florida
Television series by Boat Rocker Media